Patrick Cavanaugh is an American screen actor on television and film, and voice actor in video games.

Early life and education
Cavanaugh was raised in Vallejo, California; his parents divorced when he was young. Cavanaugh started performing as a child and did a Young Actor's Workshop at a local community college. Cavanaugh attended Diablo Valley College before transferring to Arizona State University, where he majored in theatre. Cavanaugh was on the ASU improv team.

Cavanaugh is a faculty member of John Rosenfeld Studios in West Hollywood.

Career
Cavanaugh played Pete in the film National Lampoon Presents Dorm Daze, returning as one of the leads in National Lampoon's Dorm Daze 2. Cavanaugh had the recurring role of Smitty Smith, a young, aspiring copywriter, on AMC's critically acclaimed Mad Men and played in the horror comedy movie Transylmania. He also provided the voice for the character Damian Wayne in the animated television series, Batman: The Brave and the Bold.

Filmography

Film

Television

Video games

References

External links
 

Year of birth missing (living people)
Living people
Place of birth missing (living people)
21st-century American male actors
American male film actors
American male television actors